The Acidimicrobiaceae are a family of Actinomycetota.

Phylogeny
The currently accepted taxonomy is based on the List of Prokaryotic names with Standing in Nomenclature (LPSN). The phylogeny is based on whole-genome analysis.

Notes

References 

Actinomycetota